The Cumberland Hard Court Championships or Cumberland Club Hard Court Championships and also known as the Cumberland Hard Court Tournament was a men's and women's clay court tennis tournament founded as in 1927. It was played at the Cumberland Club, Hampstead, London, England until tournament ended in 1985.

History
The Cumberland Club Hard Court Championships were founded in 1927 and played at the Cumberland Club, Hampstead, England. In 1971 the tournament was incorporated into the Bio-Strath Circuit under the sponsorship name of the Bio-Strath Cumberland Hard Court Championships or simply the Bio-Strath Cumberland, where it was the second leg of circuit that year. In 1981 the British department store retail company British Home Stores took over sponsorship of the event, and it was branded as the British Homes Store Cumberland Club Tournament. The tournament ran through till 1985 as part of the ILTF circuit then was discontinued.

References

Clay court tennis tournaments
Defunct tennis tournaments in the United Kingdom